The roan antelope (Hippotragus equinus) is a large savanna-dwelling antelope found in western, central, and southern Africa. Named for its roan colour (a reddish brown), it has lighter underbellies, white eyebrows and cheeks and black faces, lighter in females. It has short, erect manes, very light beards and prominent red nostrils. Males weigh  and females .

Taxonomy and evolution
The roan antelope shares the genus Hippotragus with the extinct bluebuck (H. leucophaeus) and the sable antelope (H. niger), and is a member of the family Bovidae. It was first described by French naturalist Étienne Geoffroy Saint-Hilaire in 1803. The specific epithet equinus derives from the Latin equus ("horse-like"), referring to the horse-like appearance of this antelope.

In 1996, an analysis of mitochondrial DNA extracted from a mounted specimen of the bluebuck found that it was outside the clade containing the roan and sable antelopes. The study therefore concluded that the bluebuck is a distinct species, and not merely a subspecies of the roan antelope. The cladogram below shows the position of the roan antelope among its relatives, following the 1996 analysis:

In 1974, palaeoanthropologist Richard Klein studied the fossils of Hippotragus species in South Africa. Most of these were found to represent the bluebuck and the roan antelope. The roan antelope seems to have appeared in the Nelson Bay Cave region following climatic changes in the Holocene.

Subspecies
Six subspecies are recognised:
H. e. bakeri (Heuglin, 1863): Occurs in Sudan (East Africa).
H. e. cottoni Dollman and Burlace, 1928: Occurs in Angola, Botswana, the southern Democratic Republic of the Congo, central and northern Malawi, and Zambia (Southern Africa).
H. e. equinus É. Geoffroy Saint-Hilaire, 1803: Occurs in Mozambique, South Africa and Zimbabwe (Southern Africa).
H. e. koba (Gray, 1872): Range extends from Senegal to Benin (West Africa).
H. e. langheldi Matschie, 1898: Occurs in Burundi, the northern Democratic Republic of the Congo, Ethiopia, Kenya, Rwanda, South Sudan, Tanzania and Uganda (East Africa).
H. e. scharicus (Schwarz, 1913): Occurs in Cameroon, the Central African Republic, Chad and eastern Nigeria (Central Africa).

Characteristics

Physical description
The roan antelope is a large antelope with a horse-like build. It is the largest antelope in the genus Hippotragus, and one of the largest species of antelopes in the world. Only elands, bongos and large male greater kudus can exceed them in weight on average. The roan antelope stands  at the shoulder, and weighs .

The long legs are supported by large hooves. The short, smooth coat is brown to amber. The ventral parts are yellow to white, while the neck and the manes are gray to black.

They are somewhat similar in appearance to the sable antelopes and can be confused where their ranges overlap. Sable antelope males are notably darker, being brownish-black rather than dark brown.

Habitat and behavior
Roan antelopes can be found in woodland, grassland, and savannah; mainly in the tropical and subtropical grasslands, savannas, and shrublands biome, which range in tree density from forest with a grassy understory (such as the central Zambezian Miombo woodlands) to grasslands dotted with few trees, where they eat mid-length grasses.

They live in small groups and form harem groups of 5 to 15 animals with one dominant male. Males commonly fight among themselves for dominance of their herd, brandishing their horns while both animals are on their knees.

References

External links

  A subspecies.

roan antelope
¨
roan antelope